Govind Singh (born 1951) is an Indian politician.

Govind Singh may also refer to:

 Govind Narayan Singh (1920–2005), Indian politician
 Govind Singh (academic) (born 1984), academic and environmental activist
 Govind Kumar Singh, Indian fashion designer

See also
 Guru Gobind Singh (1666–1708), tenth Sikh Guru
 Govind Singh Gurjar (1932–2009), Indian politician
 Govind Singh Dotasra (born 1964), Indian politician